John Harshman is a game designer who has worked primarily on role-playing games.

Career 
In 1975, Game Designers' Workshop published Triplanetary by Harshman and Marc Miller. Harshman, Frank Chadwick, and Loren Wiseman helped Miller design Traveller and the game was published in 1977. Harshman had been overseeing the direction of Traveller'''s Imperium in-house, and as GDW licensed Traveller'' to other companies, he became the contact man for these various publishers.

Personal life 
Harshman earned a doctorate in zoology and now lives in California.

References

External links 
 

Living people
Place of birth missing (living people)
Role-playing game designers
Year of birth missing (living people)